British Parachute Schools also known as Langar DZ or Skydive Langar is a BPA affiliated parachuting centre and skydiving drop zone at Langar, Nottinghamshire in the area known as the Vale of Belvoir.

History
Langar airfield was originally a World War II bomber base, home to the RAF 207 Squadron between 1942 and 1943, but is now operating solely as a civilian drop zone. British Parachute Schools has been based at the airfield since 1977. British Parachute Schools was set up by Tom Sawyer and he encouraged use by universities. One of the first was Loughborough University who moved from Peterborough Parachute Centre after a chance meeting between Tom and Ian Parker, chairman of the university club. Parker's final year project was an analysis of parachute ripcord pull forces after a stiff pull on his first free fall.

Equipment
The drop zone uses two Cessna Grand Caravans, both with Blackhawk engines.  The centre provides student training in the Ram Air Progression System, Accelerated Freefall (AFF) and Tandem skydiving.

Reputation
British Parachute Schools is the busiest civilian parachute centre in the United Kingdom, regularly completing over 30,000 descents a year.  It is also the home of LU:ST; the Langar Universities Skydiving Team; the largest collection of university skydiving clubs in the country. It is approved by the British Parachute Association. Many university parachute clubs use the site regularly.

Langar was also home to the legendary “getting Langared”. This would involve a few drinks in the bar, maybe a food delivery to the DZ or a trip to Morrisons, followed by a few more beers and a nightcap in someone’s caravan... the rest you can figure out for yourself. Legend had it, only true legends could skydive the day after being “Langared”.

See also
 Red Devils (Parachute Regiment)

References

External links
 SkydiveLangar.co.uk - Official Website
 JumpLust.com - LU:ST Website

News items
 94-year-old grandmother in charity skydive in November 2008
 Archbishop of York in June 2008
 Female canopy formation in October 2003
 Lib Dem Baroness jumps for charity in April 2003
 Anstey vicar makes skydive in September 2002
 Female formation skydive in September 2002

Parachuting in the United Kingdom
Organisations based in Nottinghamshire
Sports organizations established in 1977
Sports organisations of the United Kingdom
1977 establishments in the United Kingdom